William Randolph Hearst Jr. (January 27, 1908 – May 14, 1993) was an American businessman and newspaper publisher. He was the second son of the publisher William Randolph Hearst. He became editor-in-chief of Hearst Newspapers after the death of his father in 1951. He won a Pulitzer Prize for his interview with Soviet premier, Nikita Khrushchev, and associated commentaries in 1955.

Early life and education 
Hearst was born on January 27, 1908, in Manhattan, New York City, to William Randolph Hearst and his wife, Millicent Willson.

Hearst attended the University of California, Berkeley and was a member of the Phi Delta Theta fraternity.

Career 
Hearst was instrumental in restoring some measure of family control to the Hearst Corporation, which under his father's will is (and will continue to be while any grandchild alive at William Randolph Hearst Sr.'s death in 1951 is still living) controlled by a board of thirteen trustees, five from the Hearst family and eight Hearst executives. When tax laws changed to prevent the foundations his father had established from continuing to own the corporation, he arranged for the family trust (with the same trustees) to buy the shares and for longtime chief executive Richard E. Berlin, who was going senile, to be eased out to become chairman of the trustees for a period. Later, William Randolph Hearst Jr. himself headed the trust and served as chairman of the executive committee of the corporation. Today, his branch of the family is represented on the trustees by his son, William Randolph Hearst III.

Hearst was a member of the Sons of the American Revolution. He makes a brief appearance in the musical adaptation of Newsies as Bill.

Personal life 
Hearst was married three times:

 Alma Walker (March 24, 1928 – May 26, 1932; divorced)
 Lorelle McCarver (March 28, 1933 – March 30, 1948; divorced)
 Austine McDonnell (July 29, 1948 – December 15, 1991; her death)

He had two sons with McDonnell:
 William Randolph Hearst III (born June 18, 1949)
 John Augustine Hearst (born October 24, 1952).

References

 Washington Post; May 15, 1993; William Randolph Hearst Jr., Newspaper Editor, Dies at Age 85.
 Michael Cieply and Lindsay Chaney; The Hearsts: family and empire: the later years. .

External links

 Guide to the William Randolph Hearst, Jr. Papers at The Bancroft Library
 

1908 births
1993 deaths
20th-century American newspaper publishers (people)
American newspaper executives
Pulitzer Prize for International Reporting winners
American socialites
William Randolph Jr.
University of California, Berkeley alumni
20th-century American Episcopalians
Burials at Cypress Lawn Memorial Park